UTJ can be an abbreviation for:

Union for Traditional Judaism (an American Jewish organization)
United Torah Judaism (an Israeli Haredi political party)
Unijunction transistor (an electronic semiconductor)